

This is a list of the buildings, sites, districts, and objects listed on the National Register of Historic Places in Guam. There are currently 134 listed sites spread across 17 of the 19 villages of Guam. The villages of Agana Heights and Mongmong-Toto-Maite do not have any listings.

Listed historic sites include Spanish colonial ruins, a few surviving pre-World War II ifil houses, Japanese fortifications, two massacre sites, and a historic district.  Two other locations that were previously listed have been removed from the Register.

Numbers of listings

Agana Heights
There are no properties listed on the National Register of Historic Places in Agana Heights.

Asan-Maina

|}

Barrigada

|}

Chalan Pago-Ordot

|}

Dededo

|}

Hågat

|}

Hagåtña

|}

Former listings

|}

Humåtak

|}

Inalåhan

|}

Malesso

|}

Mangilao

|}

Mongmong-Toto-Maite
There are no properties listed on the National Register of Historic Places in Mongmong-Toto-Maite.

Piti

|}

Sånta Rita-Sumai

|}

Sinajana

|}

Talo'fo'fo

|}

Tamuning

|}

Yigo

|}

Yona

|}

See also

List of United States National Historic Landmarks in United States commonwealths and territories, associated states, and foreign states

References

External links
National Register: Aviation history in Guam Orote Field

 
Guam-related lists